The ruby meadowhawk (Sympetrum rubicundulum) is a species of dragonfly of the family Libellulidae. It is found in northern United States and southern Ontario, Canada. Adult males are identifiable by a distinctive orange to brown face and red bodies. Females faces have same colours as males; bodies are brown to dark-red.

Similar species
Sympetrum internum – cherry-faced meadowhawk
Sympetrum obtrusum – white-faced meadowhawk
Sympetrum costiferum - saffron-winged meadowhawk

References

External links 
 Species Sympetrum rubicundulum - Ruby Meadowhawk, BugGuide.Net

Libellulidae
Insects described in 1839